Roman Mihálik (born 22 January 1988) is a Slovak football defender who currently plays for the Slovak 3. liga club FK Slovan Duslo Šaľa.

External links

References

1988 births
Living people
Slovak footballers
Association football defenders
FK Inter Bratislava players
FK Senica players
MFK Karviná players
FK Slovan Duslo Šaľa players
Expatriate footballers in the Czech Republic
Slovak Super Liga players